Azazel is a character created by Isaac Asimov and featured in a series of fantasy short stories. Azazel is a two-centimeter-tall demon (or extraterrestrial), named after the Biblical demon.

Some of these stories were collected in Azazel, first published in 1988. The stories take the form of conversations between an unnamed writer (whom Asimov identifies in the collection introduction as himself) and a shiftless friend named George (named in "The Two-Centimeter Demon" as George Bitternut). At these meetings George tells how he is able to conjure up Azazel and their adventures together. George's greatest goal in life is a free lunch (or dinner, or ride, etc.), but Azazel is constrained so that he cannot directly benefit George. George can only call upon Azazel for favors to various friends, which invariably go awry. The stories' theme about a demon or alien that grants wishes echoes an earlier work by Lester del Rey, titled "No Strings Attached" from 1954.

"Getting Even" (1980) was the first story featuring Azazel, and was also the first "Union Club Mystery". Asimov stated that this story was omitted from both The Union Club Mysteries (1983) and the Azazel collection because it did not match the later stories in either series. However, it does appear in another anthology, Tales from the Spaceport Bar.

"Perfectly Formal" (1991) was a story within a story, purportedly written by a robot called Cal. It appeared in a story (also called "Cal") about a robot who learns to write stories. "Cal" appeared in the collection Gold.

Short story collection
The introduction of this book describes how  Asimov came to create Azazel, with an explanation about how the stories and book came to be published. Stories included are:

 "The Two-Centimeter Demon" – Written to introduce this collection, this story describes how the writer and George first met, and supplies information about Azazel. The tale is of George's goddaughter, in love with a mediocre basketball player. Azazel is asked to improve his game.
 "One Night of Song" – A man asks revenge on mistress who cruelly dumped him - by giving her one night performing with a perfect voice.
 "The Smile That Loses" – A woman asks George to capture her husband's radiantly happy smile in a photograph.
 "To the Victor" – A young man is unsuccessful with women, so Azazel boosts his pheromones.
 "The Dim Rumble" – A speleologist informs George that he has discovered a sound amplifier underground which, when disturbed, caused rumbles all over the world.
 "Saving Humanity" – A man wishes to be cured of being a jinx - but also wants, as compensation, to be able to save humanity.
 "A Matter of Principle" – An advertising man wants to write novels, but is unable to get past the first paragraph. George hopes to enrich himself with a share of the man's profit as a novelist.
 "The Evil Drink Does" – A beautiful but forceful girl wants to get close to a man but can't overcome her inhibitions, and is extremely sensitive to alcohol.
 "Writing Time" – An author is exasperated by the amount of time he must spend waiting everywhere he goes.
 "Dashing Through the Snow" – In order to stay at a friend's country retreat during the winter, George arranges for him to be able to fly over snow.
 "Logic Is Logic" – An idle rich man loves his snobbish club but makes no friends there, so Azazel gives him the ability to tell jokes.
 "He Travels the Fastest" – George's former lover marries a rich man, but he is miserly and will not take her abroad. Azazel gives him the urge to travel.
 "The Eye of the Beholder" – Two homely people fall in love and marry each other, but then the girl wishes she could be beautiful for him.
 "More Things in Heaven and Earth" – An economist wants to accept a new position, but each person in the post has survived a shorter time period.
 "The Mind's Construction" – A young detective believes any story a suspect tells him.
 "The Fights of Spring" – An old friend's son at college is actually studying instead of the usual youthful pursuits. George arranges for the 97-pound weakling to beat the college bully.
 "Galatea" – A young sculptress is in love with a male statue she has created.
"Flight of Fancy" – A skeptic argues with believers about the Bible, but what he really wants is to fly like an angel.

List of stories
Most of the Azazel stories originally appeared in magazines, such as Isaac Asimov's Science Fiction Magazine, The Magazine of Fantasy & Science Fiction, Analog Science Fiction/Science Fact, and Gallery. Besides the Azazel collection, a number of the stories featuring George and Azazel appear in other Asimov collections including The Winds of Change and Other Stories, Science Fiction by Asimov, The Asimov Chronicles,  Magic, and as part of the "Cal" story in the Gold collection.

Sources
 Asimovonline.com
 Introduction to Azazel collection by Isaac Asimov
 I. Asimov: A Memoir by Isaac Asimov, chapter 148
 "Isaac Asimov’s short fiction (by category)" listing by John H. Jenkins

Notes

Science fiction short story collections by Isaac Asimov
1988 short story collections
Doubleday (publisher) books